Partula exigua, common name the Moorean viviparous tree snail,  was a species of air-breathing tropical land snail, a terrestrial pulmonate gastropod mollusk in the family Partulidae. This species was endemic to the island of Moorea in French Polynesia. It is now extinct.

References

Partula (gastropod)
Extinct gastropods
Taxonomy articles created by Polbot
Taxobox binomials not recognized by IUCN